Christopher Harvey (born 9 October 1982) is a Jamaican footballer who currently plays for Harbour View.

Club career
Harvey played for Jamaican clubs Portmore United and Harbour View, and spent time on loan at with Trinidadian teams W Connection, and Joe Public. Harvey has won three Jamaica National Premier League titles - one with Portmore in 2003 and two with Harbour View in 2010 - and two JFF Champions Cup titles, both with Portmore in 2003 and 2005. He won the 2007 CFU Club Championship with Harbour View, and played in the 2008 CONCACAF Champions' Cup and the 2008-09 CONCACAF Champions League.

In 2011 Harvey transferred to the new Antigua Barracuda FC team prior to its first season in the USL Professional Division. He made his debut for the Barracudas on 21 April 2011, a 1-0 loss to Sevilla FC Puerto Rico.

International career
Harvey made his debt for the Jamaica national team in 2007, and has gone on to receive 5 caps for the Reggae Boyz, scoring one goal in the process.

References

External links

1982 births
Living people
Jamaican footballers
Jamaica international footballers
Portmore United F.C. players
W Connection F.C. players
Harbour View F.C. players
Joe Public F.C. players
Antigua Barracuda F.C. players
USL Championship players
Expatriate footballers in Trinidad and Tobago
TT Pro League players
Association football midfielders
National Premier League players